Memorie dal Futuro is the second EP of Japanese band Mono.

Track listing

References

2006 EPs
Mono (Japanese band) albums